The Rutland and District Cricket League (RDCL) is a Sunday League that administer's cricket clubs that participate in the League, Cup and trophy competitions. Albeit a Rutland centric Sunday cricket league, the headquarters for the RDCL is based in Swineshead, Lincolnshire.

The Rutland & District Cricket League operates mainly in the county of Rutland, but many clubs participate from beyond the county boundary, with representatives from Leicestershire, Lincolnshire, Cambridgeshire and Northamptonshire. For the 2021 season the RDCL held 42 teams from 32 clubs in its divisions. The League is divided into 5 Divisions with, wherever possible, a minimum of 8 and a maximum of 10 teams in each division.

Past winners

Performance by season from 2004

References

External links
 

English domestic cricket competitions
Cricket in Rutland
Cricket in Lincolnshire
Cricket in Cambridgeshire
Cricket in Leicestershire
Cricket in Huntingdonshire
Cricket in Northamptonshire
Club cricket